Jewish Center may refer to:

 Jewish Center (Manhattan), an Orthodox synagogue on the Upper West Side of Manhattan
 Jewish Center of Coney Island, a synagogue in Brighton Beach, Brooklyn, New York
 Jewish Center of the Hamptons, a synagogue in Long Island, New York
 Jewish Center of Kings Highway, Brooklyn, New York
 Jewish Center of Lake Huntington, New York
 Jewish Center of Norwich, New York
 Akron Jewish Center, a registered historic building in Akron, Ohio
 Beth El Jewish Center of Flatbush, a synagogue in Flatbush, Brooklyn
 East Meadow Jewish Center, a Conservative synagogue in East Meadow, New York
 East Midwood Jewish Center, a Conservative synagogue in Midwood, Brooklyn
 Freehold Jewish Center (Congregation Agudath Achim), a synagogue in Freehold, New Jersey
 Fort Tryon Jewish Center, a synagogue in Manhattan
 Hollis Hills Jewish Center, a Conservative synagogue in Hollis Hills, Queens
 Jericho Jewish Center, a Conservative synagogue in Jericho, New York
 Kingsway Jewish Center, a Modern Orthodox synagogue in Midwood, Brooklyn
 Lincoln Park Jewish Center, an Orthodox synagogue in Yonkers, New York
 Manhattan Beach Jewish Center, an Orthodox synagogue in Manhattan Beach, Brooklyn
 Marlboro Jewish Center (Congregation Ohev Shalom) (Congregation Ohev Shalom), a Conservative synagogue in Marlboro, New Jersey
 Mount Sinai Jewish Center, an Orthodox synagogue in Washington Heights, Manhattan
 Mosholu Jewish Center, a former synagogue in Norwood, the Bronx
 Ocean Parkway Jewish Center, a synagogue in Kensington, Brooklyn
 Pacific Jewish Center, an Orthodox synagogue in Venice, California
 Park Slope Jewish Center (Congregation Tifereth Israel), a Conservative synagogue in Park Slope, Brooklyn
 Queens Jewish Center, an Orthodox synagogue in Forest Hills, Queens
 Rego Park Jewish Center, a Conservative synagogue in Rego Park, Queens
 Riverdale Jewish Center, an Orthodox synagogue in Riverdale, the Bronx
 Rutland Jewish Center, a synagogue in Rutland, Vermont
 West Side Jewish Center (Congregation Beth Israel), an Orthodox synagogue in the Garment District of Manhattan

See also
 West Side Jewish Center (disambiguation)
 Jewish Community Center